Community Unit School District 95 is the school district that covers Lake Zurich, Illinois, USA, which is located in the Northwest suburbs of Chicago, Illinois. The towns that make up the District include Lake Zurich, Kildeer, Deer Park, Hawthorn Woods and unincorporated Forest Lake and North Barrington.

District 95 is a public schooling system made up of 8 Schools, which consist of 5 elementary schools, 2 Middle Schools, and one High school. 
The District is managed by a seven-strong Board of Education. The Superintendent is Dr. Kelley Gallt

Elementary schools 

A sixth elementary school, Charles Quentin, closed on June 5, 2009. Claudia Mall was the principal.

Middle schools

High school

References

External links 
 

School districts in Lake County, Illinois
Lake Zurich, Illinois